The N-1 Victory is an annual professional wrestling round-robin tournament held by Pro Wrestling Noah, established in 2010 as the Global League. In 2019, the tournament was rebranded as the N-1 Victory.

The N-1 Victory adopts a points system, with two points for a win, one for a time expired draw, and, none for other draw or a loss. The tournament matches are held under the GHC title match rules as the base rule, having a 30-minute time limit. The prize for winning the tournament is a shot at the GHC Heavyweight Championship.

In the below results, (c) signifies the GHC Heavyweight Champion at the time of each tournament.

List of winners

2010
The 2010 Global League was held from March 28 to May 2, through the Spring Navigation 2010 tour. The tournament featured a block system, with twelve wrestlers divided in two blocks of six. The top finishing wrestlers from each block met in the final.

2011
The 2011 Global League was held from November 3 to November 20, through the Global League 2011 tour. The tournament featured a block system, with eighteen wrestlers divided in two blocks of nine. The top finishing wrestlers from each block met in the final.

2012
The 2012 Global League was held from November 3 to November 23, through the Global League 2012 tour. The tournament featured a block system, with fourteen wrestlers divided in two blocks of seven. The top finishing wrestlers from each block met in the final.

2013
The 2013 Global League was held from October 19 to November 10. The tournament featured a block system, with fourteen wrestlers divided in two blocks of seven. The top finishing wrestlers from each block met in the final.

2014
The 2014 Global League took place from October 18 to November 8.

2015
The 2015 Global League took place from October 16 to November 8.

2016
The 2016 Global League took place from November 3 to 23.

2017
The 2017 Global League took place from October 14 to November 19.

2018
The 2018 Global League took place from October 30 to November 25. Naomichi Marufuji withdrew from the final due to a shoulder injury. A three-way match between Kenoh, Katsuhiko Nakajima, and Kohei Sato determined Marufuji's replacement, which Nakajima won.

2019
The 2019 N-1 Victory took place from August 18 to September 16. 10 wrestlers competed in 2 blocks of 5. Prior to the tournament, GHC Heavyweight Champion Kaito Kiyomiya announced he would not participate, but would instead defend the championship against the winner of the tournament at the November 2 Ryogoku event. Dragon Gate wrestler Masaaki Mochizuki and Major League Wrestling wrestlers Alexander Hammerstone and El Hijo de Dr. Wagner Jr. also competed in the tournament.

2020
The 2020 N-1 Victory tournament took place from September 18 to October 11. 12 wrestlers competed in 2 blocks of 6. Unlike the previous year, the reigning GHC Heavyweight Champion competed. Dragon Gate's Masaaki Mochizuki competed in the tournament for the second straight year. Also competing was freelancer Kazushi Sakuraba, who was one half of the GHC Tag Team Champions at the time (along with fellow entrant Takashi Sugiura). 

{| class="wikitable" style="margin: 1em auto 1em auto" align="center"
!Block A
!Kiyomiya
!Shiozaki
!Soya
!Mochizuki
!Kitamiya
!Sakuraba
|- align="center"
!Kiyomiya
|  || Kiyomiya(24:07) || Kiyomiya(21:55) || Draw(30:00) || Kitamiya(14:32) || Kiyomiya(9:47)
|- align="center"
!Shiozaki
|Kiyomiya(24:07) ||  || Shiozaki(16:54) || Mochizuki(16:21) || Shiozaki(20:00) || Shiozaki(8:35)
|- align="center"
!Soya
|Kiyomiya(21:55) || Shiozaki(16:54) ||  || Mochizuki(13:14) || Soya(12:56) || Soya(5:57)
|- align="center"
!Mochizuki
|Draw(30:00) || Mochizuki(16:21) || Mochizuki(13:14) ||  || Kitamiya(9:23) || Sakuraba(8:28)
|- align="center"
!Kitamiya
|Kitamiya(14:32) || Shiozaki(20:00) ||Soya(12:56) || Kitamiya(9:23) ||  || Sakuraba(2:29)
|- align="center"
!Sakuraba
|Kiyomiya(9:47) || Shiozaki(8:35)|| Soya(5:57)|| Sakuraba(8:28)|| Sakuraba(2:29) || 
|- align="center"
!Block B
!Kenoh
!Nakajima
!Marufuji
!Taniguchi
!Sugiura
!Inamura
|- align="center"
!Kenoh
|  || Nakajima(17:19) || Kenoh(15:05) || Kenoh(9:40) || Sugiura(16:04) || Kenoh(10:26)
|- align="center"
!Nakajima
|Nakajima(17:19)||  || Nakajima(16:25) || Taniguchi(14:42) || Nakajima(17:42) || Nakajima(11:49)
|- align="center"
!Marufuji
|Kenoh(15:05) || Nakajima(16:25) ||  || Marufuji(18:21) || Draw(30:00) || Marufuji(12:23)
|- align="center"
!Taniguchi
|Kenoh(9:40) || Taniguchi(14:42) || Marufuji(18:21) ||  || Sugiura(21:57) || Taniguchi(4:36)
|- align="center"
!Sugiura
|Sugiura(16:04) || Nakajima(17:42) || Draw(30:00) || Sugiura(21:57)||  || Sugiura(9:11)
|- align="center"
!Inamura
|Kenoh(10:26) || Nakajima(11:49) || Marufuji(12:23) || Taniguchi(4:36) || Sugiura(9:11) ||

2021
The 2021 N-1 Victory tournament took place from September 12 to October 3. 16 wrestlers competed in 4 blocks of 4, where the winners of each block advanced to the semi-finals. The semi-finals were single elimination matches with the winners facing each other in the final later in the same night. Katsuhiko Nakajima, who won the tournament, also received a GHC Heavyweight Championship match against then-champion Naomichi Marufuji at Grand Square 2021 in Osaka on October 10.

2022
The 2022 edition took place between August 11 and September 3, with the final at Osaka Prefectural Gymnasium. The participants and matches were announced on July 17. Timothy Thatcher withdrew from the tournament due to visa issues. Kinya Okada defeated Yoshiki Inamura to take Thatcher's spot in the N-1. 

{| class="wikitable" style="margin: 1em auto 1em auto" align="center"
!Block A
!Kenoh
!Fujita
!Shiozaki
!Tanaka
!Mochizuki
!Suzuki
!Wagner
!Greene
|- align="center"
!Kenoh
|  || Fujita(19:04) || Kenoh(20:00) || Tanaka(19:01) || Kenoh(13:32) || Draw(30:00) || Kenoh(15:03) || Kenoh(11:14)
|- align="center"
!Fujita
| Fujita(19:04) ||  || Fujita(20:46) || Tanaka(20:56)  || Fujita(8:43) || Fujita(19:05) || Wagner(9:23) || Fujita(4:59)
|- align="center"
!Shiozaki
| Kenoh(20:00) || Fujita(20:46) ||  || Shiozaki(15:54) || Shiozaki(14:22) || Suzuki(15:13) || Shiozaki(15:15) || Shiozaki(9:35)
|- align="center"
!Tanaka
| Tanaka(19:01) || Tanaka(20:56) || Shiozaki(15:54) ||  || Mochizuki(13:43) || Suzuki(15:24) || Wagner(11:37) || Tanaka(11:21)
|- align="center"
!Mochizuki
| Kenoh(13:32) || Fujita(8:43) || Shiozaki(14:22) || Mochizuki(13:43) ||  || Suzuki(14:35) || Wagner(13:18) || Mochizuki(9:46)
|- align="center"
!Suzuki
| Draw(30:00) || Fujita(19:05) || Suzuki(15:13) || Suzuki(15:24) || Suzuki(14:35) ||  || Suzuki(12:46) || Suzuki(9:00)
|- align="center"
!Wagner
| Kenoh(15:03) || Wagner(9:23) || Shiozaki(15:15) || Wagner(11:37) || Wagner(13:18) || Suzuki(12:46) ||  || Greene(12:12)
|- align="center"
!Greene
| Kenoh(11:14) || Fujita(4:59) || Shiozaki(9:35) || Tanaka(11:21) || Mochizuki(9:46) || Suzuki(9:00) || Greene(12:12) || 
|- align="center"
!Block B
!Funaki
!Kiyomiya
!Nakajima
!Sugiura
!Kitamiya
!Kojima
!Okada
!Morris
|- align="center"
!Funaki
|  || Kiyomiya(13:49) || Funaki(22:26) || Funaki(0:57) || Kitamiya(9:03) || Kojima(10:11) || Funaki(7:49) || Funaki(8:44) 
|- align="center"
!Kiyomiya
| Kiyomiya(13:49) ||  || Kiyomiya(17:45) || Kiyomiya(19:30) || Kitamiya(18:54) || Kiyomiya(17:06) || Kiyomiya(9:59) || Morris(11:50)
|- align="center"
!Nakajima
| Funaki(22:26) || Kiyomiya(17:45) ||  || Nakajima(16:35) || Nakajima(10:36) || Nakajima(24:44) || Nakajima(3:17) || Nakajima(13:41)
|- align="center"
!Sugiura
| Funaki(0:57) || Kiyomiya(19:30) || Nakajima(16:35) ||  || Sugiura(10:26) || Sugiura(16:54) || Sugiura(6:43) || Sugiura(16:33)
|- align="center"
!Kitamiya
| Kitamiya(9:03) || Kitamiya(18:54) || Nakajima(10:36) || Sugiura(10:26) ||  || Kojima(12:36) || Kitamiya(6:09) || Morris(11:00)
|- align="center"
!Kojima
| Kojima(10:11) || Kiyomiya(17:06) || Nakajima(24:44) || Sugiura(16:54) || Kojima(12:36) ||  || Kojima(8:50) || Kojima(12:48)
|- align="center"
!Okada
| Funaki(7:49) || Kiyomiya(9:59) || Nakajima(3:17) || Sugiura(6:43) || Kitamiya(6:09) || Kojima(8:50) ||  || Morris(11:06)
|- align="center"
!Morris
| Funaki(8:44) || Morris(11:50) || Nakajima(13:41) || Sugiura(16:33) || Morris(11:00) || Kojima(12:48) || Morris(11:06) ||

See also

Champion Carnival
G1 Climax
Fire Festival
Ikkitousen Strong Climb
D-Oh Grand Prix
King of Gate

References

External links

Pro Wrestling Noah
Pro Wrestling Noah tournaments
Pro Wrestling Noah shows